Alan Dick (15 April 1930 – 5 January 2002) was a British sprinter. He competed in the men's 400 metres at the 1952 Summer Olympics.

He also represented England and won a gold medal in the 4 x 440 Yard Relay at the 1954 British Empire and Commonwealth Games in Vancouver, Canada.

References

External links
 

1930 births
2002 deaths
British male sprinters
Olympic athletes of Great Britain
Commonwealth Games medallists in athletics
Commonwealth Games gold medallists for England
Athletes (track and field) at the 1952 Summer Olympics
Athletes (track and field) at the 1954 British Empire and Commonwealth Games
Place of birth missing
Medallists at the 1954 British Empire and Commonwealth Games